Rasheedabad is a neighbourhood in the Karachi West district of Karachi, Pakistan, that previously was a part of Baldia Town until 2011.

There are several ethnic groups in Rasheedabad and these groups include Muhajirs, Sindhis, Kashmiris, kutchi kumhar, Pakhtuns, Balochis, Brahuis,
Memons, Bohras and Ismailis.
Baldia town first colony kumhar colony.

References

External links 
 Karachi Website.

Baldia Town